The 17211 / 17212 Kondaveedu Express train belonging to Indian Railways – South Coast Railway zone is a tri-weekly train that runs between  and  in India. The train is named after the Kondaveedu Fort near Guntur City.

It operates as train number 17211 from Machilipatnam to Yesvantpur Junction and as train number 17212 in the reverse direction, serving the state of Andhra Pradesh and Karnataka.

Coaches
This train has 18 coaches viz., one 1st AC, 1 AC II tier, three AC III tier, eight sleeper class, two general second class and one second class luggage cum brake van coaches with accommodation for disabled persons.

As is customary with most train services in India, coach composition may be amended at the discretion of Indian Railways depending on demand.

Service

As the average speed of the train is below , as per Indian Railways rules, its fare does not include a Superfast surcharge.

Locomotion
From Vijayawada Junction to Yesvantpur Junction the train is hauled by Vijayawada-based WAP-4 locomotive
 Kondaveedu Express Electrified From Vijayawada to Yesvantpur (Loco:- WAP 4)

Routing
The 17211 / 12 Kondaveedu Express runs from Machilipatnam via Gudivada Junction,  to Yesvantpur Junction.

References

External links
17211 Kondaveedu Express at India Rail Info
17212 Kondaveedu Express at India Rail Info

Named passenger trains of India
Rail transport in Andhra Pradesh
Rail transport in Karnataka
Transport in Bangalore
Transport in Machilipatnam